Zoe Anne Jarman (born December 16, 1982) is an American actress, comedian and writer best known for her roles on Huge and The Mindy Project.

Biography
Jarman was raised in Nashville, Tennessee, and graduated from Hillsboro High School in 2001.

Jarman's career has mostly concentrated on comedic performances.  Her best known roles are Poppy in the 2010 ABC Family series Huge, and Betsy Putch on the first two seasons of the FOX sitcom The Mindy Project. She has also made guest appearances on The Office, The Birthday Boys, and Modern Family. 

Jarman is a regular performer at the Upright Citizens Brigade Theatre in Los Angeles, where she has performed her multiple one-woman shows.

Jarman is also a screenwriter, and has written for the Comedy Central series Workaholics and the Netflix series Master of None.

Filmography

References

External links 
 
 Possibilia at Short of the Week

1983 births
Living people
American television actresses
American television writers
People from Nashville, Tennessee
American women comedians
American women television writers
Upright Citizens Brigade Theater performers
Screenwriters from Tennessee
21st-century American comedians
21st-century American screenwriters
21st-century American actresses